Venkat Subha (died 29 May 2021) was an Indian actor, producer and writer.

Career 
He was known for his roles in films such as Azhagiya Theeye (2004), Kanda Naal Mudhal (2005) and Mozhi (2007). He also acted in few television soap operas including Nachiyarpuram, Thirumagal, Priyamanaval. In 2020, he pulled out from acting in the Vijay TV Tamil soap opera Pandian Stores midway due to personal reasons and was replaced by Ravi Chandran.

He also served as a YouTube reviewer for Touring Talkies channel giving his insights and opinions about the film receptions. He would be seen posthumously in the film Friendship.

Death 
Subha died on 29 May 2021, from COVID-19 during the COVID-19 pandemic in India. He had been admitted to a private hospital in Chennai after testing positive for the virus.

Filmography

Films

Television
 Pandian Stores
 Chithi 2
 Thirumagal
 Priyamanaval
 Nachiyarpuram

References

External links 
 

2021 deaths
21st-century Tamil male actors
Indian film producers
Indian male film actors
Place of birth missing
Year of birth missing
Male actors in Tamil cinema
Tamil male actors
Indian male television actors
Deaths from the COVID-19 pandemic in India